Events from the year 1767 in Scotland.

Incumbents

Law officers 
 Lord Advocate – James Montgomery
 Solicitor General for Scotland – Henry Dundas

Judiciary 
 Lord President of the Court of Session – Lord Arniston, the younger
 Lord Justice General – Duke of Queensberry
 Lord Justice Clerk – Lord Barskimming

Events 
 1 January – The Banking Company in Aberdeen, a co-partnery, opens for business.
 July – Edinburgh Council adopts the final plan for the New Town, for which the architect James Craig has been made a Freeman of the city on 3 June.
 Quarries and lime kilns at Charlestown, Fife, opened by Charles Bruce, 5th Earl of Elgin.
 Marischal Bridge, the first of Aberdeen's viaducts, is completed.
 Auchincruive House is built after a design by Robert Adam.
 The circular Kilarrow Parish Church in Bowmore on Islay is built.
 The Johnston family enters the printing business.
 Adam Ferguson's An Essay on the History of Civil Society is published.

Births 
 13 January – James Malcolm, Royal Marines officer (died 1849)
 1 March – Alexander Balfour, novelist, short-story writer and poet (died 1829)
 7 April – Henry Bell, marine engineer (died 1830)
 6 July – George Johnstone Hope, admiral (died 1818 in London)
 3 October – Alexander Hamilton, 10th Duke of Hamilton, politician and art collector (born, and died 1852, in London)
 Anthony Anderson, merchant and politician in Lower Canada (died 1847 in Canada)
 George Watson, portrait painter (died 1837)
 Approximate date – Miles Macdonell, settler in North America (died 1828)

Deaths 
 1 April – Laurence Oliphant, Jacobite soldier (born 1691)
 10 July – Alexander Monro, physician (born 1697 in London)
 15 July – Michael Bruce, poet and hymnist (born 1746)
 10 December – John Leslie, 10th Earl of Rothes, soldier (born 1698)
 William Delacour, portrait painter (born 1700 in France)

See also 

Timeline of Scottish history

References 

 
Years of the 18th century in Scotland
Scotland
1760s in Scotland